Lara Debbane (born 1994) is an Egyptian model and beauty pageant titleholder who was crowned Miss Egypt 2014 and represented her country at Miss Universe 2014 and Miss World 2015

Pageantry

Miss Egypt 2014
Debanne was crowned as Miss Egypt 2014 after the pageant being stopped after the events of the January 25 revolution, and has been the coronation city of Sharm el-Sheikh in Egypt, in the presence of VIPs from Egyptian and international and Egyptian Minister of Tourism. The Miss Egypt Organization in 2014 for the first time invited the famous beauty pageants titleholders to become judges. They were Miss Universe 2009, Stefania Fernandez, Miss Earth 2012, Tereza Fajksová, the reigning Miss Earth 2013, Alyz Henrich and Miss Intercontinental 2013, Ekaterina Plekhova. Lastly, special host with former Miss Egypt 2009, Elham Wagdy and special guests from Egypt, former Miss Egypt 2004 and 2005, Heba El-Sisy and Meriam George and from Tunisia, Wahiba Arres Miss Tunisia 2014.

Miss Universe 2014
Debanne competed at Miss Universe 2014 pageant but unplaced.

Miss World 2015
Debanne was supposed to compete at Miss World 2015 pageant in China but withdrew due to visa issues.

References

External links 

Living people
1994 births
Miss Egypt winners
Miss Universe 2014 contestants
Models from Cairo
Egyptian female models